The following is a list of films produced in the Kannada film industry in India in 1982, presented in alphabetical order.

See also

Kannada films of 1981
Kannada films of 1983

References 

1982
Kannada
Films, Kannada